The Cripple Creek & Victor Gold Mine, formerly and historically the Cresson Mine, is an active gold mine located near the town of Victor, in the Cripple Creek mining district in the US state of Colorado. The richest gold mine in Colorado history, it is the only remaining significant producer of gold in the state, and produced 322,000 troy ounces of gold in 2019, and reported 3.45 million troy ounces of Proven and Probable Reserves as at December 31, 2019. It was owned and operated by AngloGold Ashanti through its subsidiary, the Cripple Creek & Victor Gold Mining Company (CC&V), until 2015, when it sold the mine to Newmont Mining Corporation.

The mine is an open pit operation. The gold is recovered from the ore by heap leaching. CC&V's heap leach pad is one of the biggest in the world.

The mine has a visitor center with displays about modern mining procedures, historical photos, ore and core samples, and mineral uses. Visitors can tour the mine with advance reservation through the Victor Lowell Thomas Museum in Victor, Colorado.

Geology
The ore is in altered and brecciated volcanic and volcanoclastic rocks of Oligocene age and predominantly quartz latite composition. The Cripple Creek volcanic complex is surrounded by Precambrian gneiss, granite, and quartz monzonite. The gold occurs as disseminated micrometre-size free gold and as gold-silver tellurides, or telluride minerals. Gangue minerals include pyrite, quartz, and fluorite.

History
Gold mining in the district began in the 1890s, mostly as underground operations, chasing high grade veins. Over 23 million ounces of gold have been recovered from the district since 1890. At 2012 prices ($1600 per troy ounce ), this would be worth around US$37 billion.

Warren, Harry & Frank Woods entered the Victor mining scene in when they purchased the Mount Rosa Placer and incorporated the Mt. Rosa Mining, Milling and Land Company on January 9, 1892.  This would later become known as the Cripple Creek & Victor Gold Mine.

Most of the Cripple Creek properties were consolidated into the Golden Cycle Mining and Reduction Company, and the Carlton Tunnel was completed in 1941.  This 6.5 mile long tunnel drained the district down to 3,000 feet.  The roasting-cyanidation Carlton Mill opened in March 1951.  This mill also tested the first carbon adsorption-desorption process.

The Cripple Creek and Victor Narrow Gauge Railroad was opened in 1967 and continues to serve as a tourist attraction.

The current open cut operation dates back to 1995. The operation became part of AngloGold in March 1999, when the company acquired the Independence Mining Company and thereby 66% of the mine. AngloGold merged with junior partner Golden Cycle Gold Corporation in 2008 and thereby acquired the remaining 33% of the project.

The mine is a low-cost, low-yield open pit operation, with grades well below one gram of gold per tonne of ore. In recent years, 2008 and 2009, the mine accounted for 5% of AngloGold Ashanti's worldwide production. It is the company's only active operation in the United States. In 2008, the State of Colorado and Teller County granted the mine a mine-life extension.

Production and grade of the mine have steadily declined over the last few years, while the total production costs have risen from US$372 an ounce in 2007 to US$475 in 2009. The mine employed 562 people in 2009, of which 367 were permanent employees.

In August 2015, the mine was sold to Newmont Mining Corporation.

Cresson Vug
On 24 November 1914, Dick Roelofs was supervising the exploration of the mine to the 1300 level, when a large gold-filled vug was blasted open on the 1200 level.  The next day, Roelof, a mine owner and an attorney explored the "cave of sparkling jewels".  The vug measured 14 feet wide, 23 feet long, 36 feet high, which took a month to empty, and yielded 60,000 troy ounces of gold.

Two "Aladdin's caves of gold" were discovered in August 1953, on the 3100 foot level of Ajax Mine, Battle Mountain.  Sylvanite and Calaverite covered the walls. Mine superintendent M.H. Grice stated, "It is a sight a mining man may see but once in a lifetime..."

Production

Past production figures since 1995 were:

Gallery

See also
Joseph Raphael De Lamar
Binger Hermann
Spencer Penrose
Charles L. Tutt, Sr.
Gold mining in Colorado
Silver mining in Colorado

References

Further reading
Cross, W., and Penrose, R.A.F., 1895, Geology and Mining Industries of the Cripple Creek District, Colorado, USGS, Washington: Government Printing Office
Lindgren, W., and Ransome, F.L., 1904, Geological Resurvey of the Cripple Creek District, Colorado, USGS Bulleting No. 254, Washington: Government Printing Office
Lindgren, W., and Ransome, F.L., 1906, Geology and Gold Deposits of the Cripple Creek District, COlorado, USGS Professional Paper No. 54, Washington: Government Printing Office

External links 
 Newmont Goldcorp website
 Cripple Creek & Victor Gold Mining Company website

 2003 Mining History Association Conference in Cripple Creek
 Mining Technology Report

AngloGold Ashanti
Buildings and structures in Teller County, Colorado
Gold mines in Colorado
History of Teller County, Colorado
Open-pit mines
Surface mines in the United States
Tourist attractions in Teller County, Colorado